Nigel Clutton (born 12 February 1954) is an English former footballer who played as a forward. He made a professional appearance for his hometown club, Chester.

Clutton was a prolific striker playing Saturday and Sunday League football for Chester-based sides Blacon YC, Crusaders, Reliance and the Union Vaults and working as a milkman when he was given his solitary Football League outing for Chester on 1 March 1978 at home to Carlisle United. Clutton was given his chance due to injuries to Ian Edwards and Ian Howat and he lined up in attack alongside new signing Ian Mellor

Nigel still lives in Chester with his wife, Helen and cat, Teddy.
.

References

1954 births
Living people
Sportspeople from Chester
English footballers
Association football forwards
Chester City F.C. players
English Football League players